Ritual Carnage is a thrash metal band formed in 1998. All the members are Japanese except for Damian Montgomery, their American frontman and leader.

Members

Current members 
 Damian "Danny Carnage" Montgomery – vocals (Barbatos)
 Wataru Yamada – guitar (King's-Evil)
 Kenichi "Eddie Van" Koide – guitar (X Japan, The Wretched)
 Hiroyuki Ishizawa – bass (King's-Evil)
 Naoya Hamaii – drums

Former members 
 Shigeyuki Kamazawa – guitar (Grim Force)
 Bill Jokela – guitar (Bereaved)
 Ken Kubo – guitar (Bereaved, Miscreant Invocation, Blood Shower)
 Katsuyuki Nakabayashi – guitar (Grim Force)
 Hidenori Tanaka – guitar (Tyrant)
 Masami Yamada – guitar (King's-Evil)
 Hide Ideno – bass
 Alex Amedy – drums
 Shinjiro Sawada – drums (Blood Shower)

Discography

References

External links 
  (expired)
 Interview with Damian

Japanese death metal musical groups
Japanese thrash metal musical groups
Musical groups established in 1998